The 1976–77 North Carolina Tar Heels men's basketball team represented the University of North Carolina at Chapel Hill in the 1976–77 NCAA Division I men's basketball season. The Tar Heels were coached by Dean Smith in his 16th season at North Carolina. They played their home games in Carmichael Auditorium as members of the Atlantic Coast Conference. They finished the season 28–5, 9–3 in ACC play to win the ACC regular season championship. They defeated NC State and Virginia to win the ACC Tournament. As a result, the received the conference's automatic bid to the NCAA tournament. There, they defeated Purdue, Notre Dame, and Kentucky to advance to the Final Four. At the Final Four, they defeated UNLV before losing to Marquette in the National Championship game.

Schedule and results

|-
!colspan=9 style=|Regular season

|-
!colspan=9 style=|ACC Tournament

|-
!colspan=9 style=|NCAA Tournament

Roster

References

North Carolina Tar Heels men's basketball seasons
North Carolina
NCAA Division I men's basketball tournament Final Four seasons
North Carolina
Tar
Tar